Andreas Lütkefels (19 June 1964 – 9 May 2022) was a German rower. He competed in the men's coxed four event at the 1988 Summer Olympics.

References

External links
 

1964 births
2022 deaths
German male rowers
Olympic rowers of West Germany
Rowers at the 1988 Summer Olympics
Sportspeople from Münster